The spouse of the prime minister of Malaysia refers to the spouse of the head of government of Malaysia, the prime minister. Since independence in 1957, the title has been held by women, therefore the spouse is also known as the prime minister's wife. Some commentators have tried to style prime ministers' wives as "First Lady of Malaysia", similar to the style of First Lady used in republics, but this is not a recognised title. To date, ten women have held the title of the spouse of the prime minister of Malaysia.

Role of the spouse of the prime minister of Malaysia
The spouse of the prime minister of Malaysia is not an elected position, carries no official duties, and brings no salary. However, she does receive some allowance as recognition of her time and energy put into being the spouse of the prime minister of Malaysia.

As the spouse of the prime minister of Malaysia, she attends many official ceremonies and functions of state either along with or representing the prime minister. There is a strict taboo against the spouse holding outside employment while serving as spouse of the prime minister of Malaysia.

Following the Asian value system, where the woman is the guiding light and pillar of the household, the spouse also represents family values and is taken as a motherly figure.

The spouse of the prime minister of Malaysia frequently participates in humanitarian and charitable work. It became increasingly common for spouses of heads of state or government to select specific causes to promote, usually ones that are not politically divisive. It is common for the spouse of the prime minister of Malaysia to form organisations and hire a staff to support these activities.

List of spouses of prime ministers of Malaysia

List of spouses of prime ministers of Malaysia by Age

Controversy

Controversy over the usage of the title "First Lady"
The Yang di-Pertuan Agong (King of Malaysia) is a constitutional figurehead within the framework of a constitutional monarchy. It is argued that Article 32(2) of the Constitution of Malaysia stipulates that the Consort of the Yang di-Pertuan Agong takes precedence over all individuals in the federation and is second only to the Yang di-Pertuan Agong himself. Hence, it is argued that the Raja Permaisuri Agong is, by strict analogy only, the First Lady of Malaysia. It should however be borne in mind that such a title cannot exist in Malaysia in the first place, as "First Lady" exclusively refers to wives of presidents and not monarchs.

Before Najib's premiership, there had not been a precedent in Malaysia where someone other than the wife of the prime minister served as a self-styled "First Lady". While the Prime Minister Abdullah Ahmad Badawi's first late wife, Tun Endon Mahmood Ambak underwent treatment for breast cancer in the United States, the title of "First Lady" was not officially designated.

The issue was brought up only during the premiership of Najib when his wife widely used the title of "First Lady". Many quarters either argue that it is reserved for the Raja Permaisuri Agong, or that it should never be used at all due to Malaysia not being a republic.

The issue didn't stop there as there was an obscure new unit established within the Prime Minister's Department with the acronym FLOM (which was not explained on the website, but taken to stand for "First Lady of Malaysia"). Datuk Siti Azizah binti Sheikh Abod was the Special Officer for the unit. The news on FLOM was widely covered by many bloggers with their own stories and analysis. This led to the government webpage containing the information of the contacts in FLOM department to be removed a few days after the story came out. However some search engines managed to store the cached version of the page. Many groups questioned the validity and functionality of the department. There were also some queries, especially in the Malaysian Parliament, on how much allocation from the National Budget was allocated for the department.

See also
 Spouse of the deputy prime minister of Malaysia

References

 
Malaysia
Lists of Malaysian people